Sebat Bet ("Seven houses") is an Afroasiatic language spoken in Ethiopia.

Overview

One of the Gurage languages, Sebat Bet is divided into several dialects. The latter are spoken in the western Gurage Region:
Chaha (Cheha) is spoken in Cheha and is the best studied of these varieties
Ezha (Eza, Izha) is spoken in Ezhana Wolene
Muher is spoken in the mountains north of Cheha and Ezhana Wolene
Geta is spoken in Geta 
Gumer (Gwemarra, Gʷəmarə), spoken in Gumer
Inor (Enemor), spoken in Enemorina Eaner
 Endegegn and the extinct Mesmes language are sometimes considered subdialects of Inor.

Notes

Further reading
 Leslau, Wolf. 1997. "Chaha (Gurage) Phonology" in Kaye, Alan S. (ed.): Phonologies of Asia and Africa 1. Winona Lake: Eisenbrauns. pp. 373–397.
Rose, Sharon. 2007. "Chaha (Gurage) Morphology" in Kaye, Alan D. (ed.): Morphologies of Africa and Asia 1. Winona Lake: Eisenbrauns. pp. 403–427.

External links
 World Atlas of Language Structures information on Chaha

Languages of Ethiopia
Outer Ethiopian Semitic languages